The PWS-16 was a biplane trainer designed and developed by Podlaska Wytwórnia Samolotów (PWS). An armed variant also entered production as the PWS-26.

Development
Developed from the PWS-12 and PWS-14 trainers, the PWS-16 two-seat biplane design introduced a number of improvements particularly improved ailerons. A variant designated PWS-16bis had a revised fuel system to allow inverted flight. It had also improved aerodynamics and its silhouette changed. The aircraft entered service with the Polish Air Force training units between 1933 and 1934. An improved armed version was developed as the PWS-26 and when the PWS-26 entered service in 1937, the PWS-16 was relegated to secondary duties.

Variants
PWS-16
20 built.
PWS-16bis
20 built.
PWS-26
Armed trainer variant.

Operators

Polish Air Force
 
Aviación Nacional (20 bought through SEPEWE in 1937)

Specifications (PWS-16)

See also

References

 

1930s Polish military trainer aircraft
PWS aircraft